Wolfgang Muff (15 March 1880 – 17 May 1947) was a general in the Wehrmacht during the time of Nazi Germany.

Born in Ulm to General Karl Ludwig Muff, Wolfgang Muff joined the German Army as an officer cadet in 1899, receiving his commission as lieutenant in 1900. Rising through the ranks and decorated several times during World War I he was in charge of the Reichswehr's 13th Infantry Regiment stationed at Ludwigsburg from 1 March 1930 until 20 September 1931 having attained the rank of colonel.

By early 1938 Muff was a lieutenant general serving as the military attaché (1934–1938) in Vienna of Franz von Papen while he was German ambassador to Austria. According to Papen, documents approved by Rudolf Hess indicate that Adolf Hitler considered having Papen or Muff murdered in early 1938; Hitler would then blame the deaths on Austrians to provide an excuse for Germany to intervene in Austrian affairs. On 11 March 1938, Muff brought a German ultimatum threatening an invasion to Wilhelm Miklas, but the Austrian president refused to yield. Arthur Seyss-Inquart, however, forged a telegram requesting German intervention in Austria which led to the Anschluss of Austria into Nazi Germany the following day.

After the Anschluss, Muff headed the so-called Muff Commission which determined which Austrian officers would be transferred from the Bundesheer into the Wehrmacht.

Muff was General of Infantry for Wehrkreis XI in Hanover from 1 September 1939 until 28 February 1943 when he retired.

Wolfgang Muff died on 17 May 1947 in Bad Pyrmont.

References
Shirer, William L. The Rise and Fall of the Third Reich. Random House. 1991. 
Mayerhofer, Rainer. "Österreichs Weg zum Anschluss im März 1938". Wiener Zeitung. Accessed September 15, 2006. 
Axis History.net. "Wehrkreis XI". Accessed September 15, 2006.
Militärgeschichtles Forschungsamt. Oberstleutnant Dipl.-Staatswiss. Dr. Helmut R. Hammerich. Accessed September 15, 2006. 
Jewison, Glenn & Jörg C. Steiner. "Mauritz von Wiktorin". Austro-Hungarian Land Forces 1848-1918. Accessed September 15, 2006.
Lexikon der Wehrmacht. "Infanterie-Regiment 13". Accessed September 15, 2006. 

1880 births
1947 deaths
Military personnel from Ulm
German Army generals of World War II
Generals of Infantry (Wehrmacht)
People from the Kingdom of Württemberg
German Army personnel of World War I
Major generals of the Reichswehr
German military attachés